Sidney Luckman (November 21, 1916 – July 5, 1998) was an American professional football player who was a quarterback for the Chicago Bears of the National Football League (NFL) from 1939 through 1950. During his 12 seasons with the Bears, he led them to four NFL championships (1940, 1941, 1943, and 1946).

Sportswriter Ira Berkow wrote that Luckman was "the first great T-formation quarterback", and he is considered the greatest long-range passer of his time. He was named the NFL's Most Valuable Player in 1943.  Luckman was also a 3× NFL All-Star (1940–1942), 5× First-team All-Pro (1941–1944, 1947), 2× Second-Team All-Pro (1940, 1946), 3× NFL passing yards leader (1943, 1945, and 1946), 3× NFL passing touchdowns leader (1943, 1945, and 1946), 3× NFL passer rating leader (1941, 1943, and 1946), named to the NFL 1940s All-Decade Team, had his Chicago Bears No. 42 retired, and tied the NFL record of 7 touchdown passes in a game. To this day, Luckman still holds the all-time NFL record for touchdown percentage, at 7.9 percent.

Luckman was inducted into the Pro Football Hall of Fame in 1965, and in 1988 he was declared a joint winner of the Walter Camp Distinguished American Award. Following his retirement from playing, Luckman continued his association with football by tutoring college coaches, focusing on the passing aspect of the game.

Early life
Luckman was born in Brooklyn, New York, to Jewish immigrants from Lithuania, Meyer and Ethel Druckman Luckman.  His father sparked his interest in football at age eight, by giving him a football to play with. He and his parents lived first in Williamsburg, Brooklyn, and then in a residence near Prospect Park in Flatbush, in Brooklyn, and it was here as a youngster that Sid first started throwing a football.

He played both baseball and football for Erasmus Hall High School, with his football skills impressing recruiters from about 40 colleges.  Playing quarterback, he led the Erasmus Hall High School football team to two all-city championships.

Luckman chose Columbia University after meeting Lions coach Lou Little during a Columbia/Navy game at the university's Baker Field athletic facility.  Luckman was not admitted to Columbia College; instead, he attended the New College for the Education of Teachers, an undergraduate school which was within Teachers College at Columbia.  He competed on the football team from 1936 until the New College closed in 1939, at which point he transferred to Columbia College. Coach Little had a problem getting good high school athletes because of the entrance requirements at Columbia, and Columbia didn’t have any physical education undergraduate program so when New College was started, Lou Little was happy because they had a P. E. Department. In fact, the 1936 varsity football squad had five other New College students; Hubert Schulze, Edward Stanzyk, Oscar Bonom, Harry Ream, and Antoni Mareski.

At Columbia, Luckman was a member of the Zeta Beta Tau fraternity.  Keen to remain in Columbia to stay close to his family, he took on jobs such as dishwashing, babysitting, and messenger delivery around the campus.  At Columbia, as a part of the football team, he completed 180 of 376 passes for 2,413 yards and 20 touchdowns and finished third in the 1938 Heisman Trophy voting, behind Davey O'Brien and Marshall Goldberg.

Chicago Bears

Draft
Hearing of Sid Luckman's exploits as a single-wing tailback at Columbia University, Chicago Bears owner and coach George Halas believed Luckman had the ability to become an effective T-formation quarterback, and traveled to New York to watch him play. Halas then convinced the Pittsburgh Pirates (later the Steelers) to draft Luckman second overall and then trade him to the Bears, because he was interested in using Luckman's skills to help him restructure the offensive side of the game.  However, despite his successes at Columbia University, Luckman initially declined any further interest in pro football, instead preferring to work for his father-in-law's trucking company. Halas went to work on convincing him otherwise. After gaining an invitation to Luckman's tiny apartment for a dinner which Luckman's wife Estelle prepared, Halas produced a contract for $5,500 ($ today), which Luckman immediately signed.  At that time both at the college and pro levels, offenses were a drab scrum of running the ball with only occasional passes. In what was then the predominant single-wing formation, the quarterback was primarily a blocking back and rarely touched the ball. Most passing was done by the tailback, and then usually only on third down with long yardage to go. Halas and his coaches, primarily Clark Shaughnessy, invented a rather complex scheme building on the traditional T-formation, but needed the right quarterback to run it properly.

Upon starting with Halas, Luckman mastered an offense that revolutionized football and became the basis of most modern professional offenses. Eventually, Luckman tutored college coaches across the Big Ten, Notre Dame and West Point in the intricacies of the passing game.

T-formation

In 1940, during his second season with the Bears, Luckman took over the offense and led the Bears to the title game against Sammy Baugh and the Washington Redskins. The Redskins had beaten the Bears, 7–3, during the regular season. Using the "man-in-motion" innovation to great advantage, the Bears destroyed the Redskins, 73–0, stated to be "the most one-sided game in the history of the sport". Luckman passed only six times, with four completions and 102 yards in the rout.

From 1940 to 1946, the Bears displayed their dominance in the game, playing in five NFL championship games, winning four, and posted a 54–17–3 regular-season record. In 1942, the Bears posted a perfect 11–0 record and outscored their opponents, 376–84, however, they lost the championship game to the Redskins. Although the T-formation had been used many years before Luckman joined the Chicago Bears, he was central to Chicago's successful use of this style of play because of his game-sense and versatility. Perfecting Halas' complex offensive scheme of fakes, men in motion, and quick-hitting runs, Luckman added the dimension of accurate downfield throwing. He was instrumental in his team's record-setting 73–0 win over the Washington Redskins in the 1940 NFL championship game. Sportscaster Jimmy Cannon once said in reference to Luckman's years at Columbia, "You had to be there to realize how great Sid was." Luckman later became a sought-after tutor and instructor for universities wishing to install the T-formation as an offense.

Service with the Merchant Marine
In 1943, as soon as the season had ended, Luckman volunteered as an ensign with the U. S. Merchant Marine. He was stationed stateside and while he could not practice with the team, he did receive permission to play for the Bears on game days during the following seasons. He returned again to the Bears, as a full-time occupation, in 1946 and led them to a fifth NFL championship.

Numbers and accomplishments
During his career, Luckman completed 51.8% of his passes for 14,686 yards and 137 touchdowns with 132 interceptions. He averaged 8.4 yards per attempt, second all-time only to Otto Graham (9.0), and also has a career touchdown rate (percentage of pass attempts that result in touchdowns) of 7.9 percent.

In 1943, Luckman completed 110 of 202 passes for 2194 yards and 28 touchdowns. His 13.9% touchdown rate that year is the best ever in a single-season, while his 10.9 yards per attempt is second all-time. During one game that year, Luckman threw for 443 yards and seven touchdowns, still tied for the most passing touchdowns in one game; it was also the first 400-yard passing game in NFL history.  His 28 touchdown passes in 1943 (in only 10 games) was a record that lasted until 1959, a 12-game season.

Luckman led the NFL in yards per attempt an NFL record seven times, including a record five consecutive years from 1939 to 1943, and led the NFL in passing yards three times. Luckman was a five-time All-NFL selection, was named the National Football League's Most Valuable Player Award in 1943, and led the "Monsters of the Midway" to championships in 1940, 1941, 1943, and 1946. Despite the fact that his career ended in 1950, Luckman still owns several Bears' passing records, including:
 Intercepted: career (132), season (31 in 1947)
 Yds/Pass Att: career (8.42), season (10.86 in 1943)

NFL career statistics

Later years

Upon retiring as a player, Luckman remained with the Bears as a vice president. In 1954, he became the team's quarterbacks coach on a part-time basis, a position he held through the 1960s.

After departing the NFL, he went to work for Cel-U-Craft, a Chicago-based manufacturer of cellophane products, eventually becoming its president. The company was a part of  the Rapid American Corporation of which he also obtained shares.  In 1969, Rapid American was the subject of an Internal Revenue Service investigation over the payment of these shares and dividends, a case that Luckman and his wife appealed.

Luckman's wife, Estelle Morgolin, died of cancer in 1981, and he underwent a triple heart bypass operation the following year. Luckman eventually retired to Aventura, Florida, where he died on July 5, 1998, at the age of 81. He was survived by a son, Bob, and two daughters, Gale and Ellen.

List of honors
 Joe F. Carr Trophy – National Football League Most Valuable Player in 1943.
 College Football Hall of Fame in 1960.
 Pro Football Hall of Fame in 1965.
 International Jewish Sports Hall of Fame in 1979.
 Walter Camp Distinguished American of the Year Award in 1988.
 Columbia University Athletics Hall of Fame in 2006.

See also
List of select Jewish football players

Notes

References

Further reading
 Slater, Robert, 2003 Great Jews in Sports. Jonathan David Publishers Inc

External links
 
 
 
 

1916 births
1998 deaths
American football quarterbacks
United States Merchant Mariners of World War II
American people of German-Jewish descent
Chicago Bears players
Chicago Bears coaches
College Football Hall of Fame inductees
Columbia Lions football players
Columbia College (New York) alumni
Erasmus Hall High School alumni
Jewish American sportspeople
National Football League players with retired numbers
People from Aventura, Florida
Pro Football Hall of Fame inductees
Sportspeople from Brooklyn
Players of American football from New York City
People from Williamsburg, Brooklyn
United States Navy officers
20th-century American Jews
National Football League Most Valuable Player Award winners